The 2021 Southeastern Louisiana Lions football team represented Southeastern Louisiana University as a member of the Southland Conference during the 2021 NCAA Division I FCS football season. The Lions were led by fourth-year head coach Frank Scelfo and played their home games at Strawberry Stadium.

Previous season

The Lions finished the 2020–21 season with 4–3 overall record and 4–2 in conference record to finish in the second place in the SLC. Also they finished ranked No. 20 in STATS and No. 21 in Coaches rankings.

Preseason

Preseason poll
The Southland Conference released their preseason poll in July 2021. The Lions were picked to finish first in the conference. In addition, sixteen Lions were chosen to the Preseason All-Southland Team.

Preseason All–Southland Teams

Offense

1st Team
Cole Kelley – Quarterback, SR
CJ Turner – Wide Receiver, RS-JR
Jalen Bell – Offensive Lineman, JR
Mateo Rengifo – Kicker, SO
Austin Dunlap – Punter, SO

2nd Team
Damien Dawson – Tight End/Halfback, RS-SR
Austin Mitchell – Wide Receiver, RS-SR
Ethan McMullan – Offensive Lineman, SR
Rendon Miles-Character – Offensive Lineman, SR
Drew Jones – Offensive Lineman, SR

Defense

1st Team
Darrius Harry – Defensive Lineman, RS-FR
Alexis Ramos – Linebacker, SR
Ferlando Jordan – Defensive Back, RS-JR
Donnell Ward-McGee – Defensive Back, JR

2nd Team
Herman Christophe – Linebacker, SO
Jack Henderson – Defensive Back, FR

Personnel

Schedule

Game summaries

North Alabama

at Louisiana Tech

at Central Connecticut

Northwestern State

at McNeese State

at No. 25 Nicholls

Houston Baptist

at Northwestern State

McNeese State

at No. 22 Incarnate Word

Nicholls

FCS Playoffs

vs. No. 22 Florida A&M – First Round

at No. 3 Dukes – Second Round

References

Southeastern Louisiana
Southeastern Louisiana Lions football seasons
2021 NCAA Division I FCS playoff participants
Southeastern Louisiana Lions football